Abassia is an old spelling of several places:

 Abbassia, a town in Egypt
 Abyssinia, the Ethiopian Empire
 Abasgia, the Kingdom of Abkhazia